Pterostylis longifolia, commonly known as the common leafy greenhood or tall greenhood, is a plant in the orchid family Orchidaceae and is endemic to eastern Australia. Flowering plants have up to seven flowers which are green, partly transparent and which have a labellum which is pale green and hairy with a blackish central stripe. Non-flowering plants have a rosette of leaves but flowering plants lack the rosette, instead having five to eight stem leaves. A similar species, Pterostylis melagramma has paler green flowers which have a less hairy labellum.

Description
Pterostylis longifolia, is a terrestrial,  perennial, deciduous, herb with an underground tuber. Flowering occurs from April to September.

Taxonomy and naming
Pterostylis longifolia was first formally described in 1880 by Robert Brown and the description was published in Prodromus Florae Novae Hollandiae et Insulae Van Diemen. The specific epithet (longifolia) is derived from the Latin words longus meaning "long" and folia meaning "leaves".

Distribution and habitat
Pterostylis longifolia occurs in New South Wales and southern Queensland on the coast and tablelands, growing in forest and coastal scrub.

References

longifolia
Endemic orchids of Australia
Orchids of New South Wales
Orchids of Queensland
Plants described in 1810